T69 May refer to:

T69 tram, see West Midlands Metro rolling stock#T-69
T69 (tank)